Cristian Roberto Aracena (born 8 February 1987) is an Argentine professional footballer who plays as a goalkeeper for Club Almagro.

Career
Godoy Cruz were the first club of Aracena's career. He was contracted with them between 2005 and 2013 but didn't make a senior league appearance, spending the vast majority of his time out on loan. Aracena's opening loan spell was to Gimnasia y Esgrima of Torneo Argentino A, where he featured three times in 2007. A stint with fellow third tier Sportivo Italiano followed three years later in 2010, which preceded Aracena joining Primera B Nacional's 9 de Julio midway through the year on 30 June. No appearances were made for either of the two teams. Deportivo Maipú loaned Aracena in January 2011.

Having appeared in seven fixtures for Deportivo Maipú, Aracena sealed a return to Gimnasia y Esgrima on 30 June 2011. Twelve months after, Aracena signed his final loan away from Godoy Cruz by moving to Deportivo Guaymallén. He remained for two years in Torneo Argentino B/Torneo Federal B, making a total of forty-nine appearances. On 28 February 2014, Aracena agreed to join Gutiérrez. Gutiérrez won promotion to Torneo Federal A in his first campaign. January 2016 saw Aracena complete a free transfer to Independiente Rivadavia. He made his professional bow in February versus Instituto.

Career statistics
.

References

External links

1987 births
Living people
Sportspeople from Mendoza, Argentina
Argentine footballers
Association football goalkeepers
Torneo Argentino A players
Torneo Argentino B players
Torneo Federal A players
Primera Nacional players
Godoy Cruz Antonio Tomba footballers
Gimnasia y Esgrima de Mendoza footballers
Sportivo Italiano footballers
9 de Julio de Rafaela players
Deportivo Maipú players
Deportivo Guaymallén players
Independiente Rivadavia footballers
Club Almagro players